Cwmamman is a community in Carmarthenshire, about 12 miles north of Swansea in southwest Wales. Literally meaning "Amman valley", it takes its name from the River Amman which runs through the area.

Cwmamman was the original name of the area but as coal-mining boomed during the late 19th century the western end became known as Glanamman and the eastern end as Garnant. The distinction was promoted by having two stations on the Llanelly Railway built in 1840, Garnant (originally called Amman Valley) and Glanamman. The name Cwmamman was revived for the modern urban council covering the two towns, which now have much smaller populations than in their heyday at the turn of the 20th century. The actual population for the community at the 2011 census was 4,486.

Christchurch, the only Commissioners' church in southwest Wales was built in Garnant in 1839–42. In contrast, four Methodist chapels were constructed in Glanamman before St Margaret's church was built in 1933.

Cwmamman is 78.47% Welsh speaking and lies at the foot of the Black Mountain. The community is bordered by the communities of: Betws; Llandybie; Dyffryn Cennen; and Quarter Bach, all being in Carmarthenshire; and by Gwaun-Cae-Gurwen and Pontardawe in Neath Port Talbot.

The two Carmarthenshire County Council electoral wards covering the community are called Garnant and Glanamman, each electing one county councillor.

References

External links

Communities in Carmarthenshire
Villages in Carmarthenshire